Isaac Benjamin de Villiers (10 March 1892 – 9 September 1966) was a South African rugby player. He played as full-back. He was more commonly known as "IB".

Career
De Villiers played rugby for Transvaal and was selected from the Australian tour in 1921. He made his International South Africa  debut on 27 June 1921, on the Royal Agricultural Showground in Sydney, Australia  playing fullback. This was a game between the Springboks and an Australian XV. He converted two tries score that day. The springboks  won 16-11.

Personal life
De Villiers was born was born in Johannesburg, South African Republic, to Isaac, a farmer and Francina Hofmeyr. He was one of 2 children.  He worked as transport officer and married Gertruida van Heerden in 1913. He had two children with her.

He died on 9 September 1966, in Johannesburg, South Africa

References 

South African rugby union players
1892 births
1966 deaths
South Africa international rugby union players
Rugby union fullbacks
Rugby union players from Johannesburg
Golden Lions players